Barfoot & Thompson Stadium (formerly ASB Stadium), is a New Zealand venue for sports and entertainment events in Kohimarama, Auckland, New Zealand. The name sponsorship by Barfoot & Thompson, a leading real estate company, began in 2018.  Barfoot & Thompson Stadium is a training and competition venue for many local clubs and organisations including East City Futsal Indoor Soccer Club, Auckland Ultimate, Auckland Basketball, Sparta Volleyball Club, Orakei Tigers Basketball Club, Howick & St Heliers Judo Club, Aikido Auckland Aikikai and many more. The venue has many other facilities as well, including a preschool, gym, physio therapy, after school care and school holiday programme, and is located on Selwyn College.

Board of Trustees
Barfoot & Thompson Stadium is administered under a Trust Deed by a Board of Trustees. The East City Community Trust is a fully constituted Charitable Trust made up of three members namely:

Selwyn College (Ministry of Education), Barfoot & Thompson Stadium Sports Clubs, and the local community represented by the Ōrākei Local Board.

The current Trustees are:
Sheryll Ofner (Chairperson) – Principal of Selwyn College
Barbara Gwilliam (Trustee) – Barfoot & Thompson Stadium Sports Clubs
David Wong (Trustee) – Community representative from the Ōrākei Local Board
Mark Anderson (Trustee)

Kickboxing and boxing
Barfoot & Thompson Stadium has been the host for over a hundred kickboxing and boxing events. Most notable events include

Over 15 King in the Ring Kickboxing tournaments since 2011
Jimmy Thunder vs Craig Petersen for the Australian heavyweight title (1992, Pro boxing)
Sonni Michael Angelo vs Maselino Masoe for the vacant WBO Asia Pacific super middleweight title (2008, Pro boxing)
Shane Cameron vs Colin Wilson for the Vacant Australasian Heavyweight Title (2005, Pro boxing)

Commonwealth Games
In 1990, Barfoot & Thompson Stadium played host to Gymnastics for the Commonwealth Games.

References

External links
Barfoot Stadium Official Website

1987 establishments in New Zealand
Sports venues in Auckland
Indoor arenas in New Zealand
Boxing venues in New Zealand
1980s architecture in New Zealand